The Second Affiliated Hospital of Kunming Medical University (KMU) is a large general hospital in the capital of Yunnan Province, China. Established in 1952, it is among the "100 best general hospitals of China" and is the center for both human organ transplant and burn treatment in Yunnan. It has the first certified resident training center in Yunnan Province, started in 2006.

References

Hospital buildings completed in 1952
Hospitals in Yunnan
Buildings and structures in Kunming
1952 establishments in China
Hospitals established in 1952